

Buildings and structures

Buildings

 1650
 The Marian column in Prague is erected (destroyed 1918).
 Talar Ashraf palace in Isfahan, Persia, is built.
 (approximate date) The Khaju Bridge in Isfahan is built.
 1651
 Collegiate Church of Saint Magdalena and Saint Stanisław in Poznań (Poland) is started (completed c.1701).
 Karamon of Ueno Tōshō-gū shrine in Tokyo is built.
 1652 – Church of the Resurrection, Kostroma.
 1653
 The Taj Mahal mausoleum at Agra in India (begun in 1630 and probably designed by Ustad Ahmad Lahauri) is completed.
 The Radziwiłł Palace, Vilnius, is completed.
 1654 – Construction of Skokloster Castle in Sweden to the design of Caspar Vogel begins (completed 1676).
 1656
 The Jama Masjid, Delhi, is completed.
 The colonnade of St. Peter's Basilica in Rome is started by Gian Lorenzo Bernini.
 1658
 Terraced houses at 52–55 Newington Green in London, perhaps by Thomas Pidcock, are completed.
 St Nicholas Abbey (plantation house) in Saint Peter, Barbados, is begun.
 1659
 Trashigang Dzong in Bhutan is built.
 Ca' Pesaro on the Grand Canal (Venice) is started by Baldassarre Longhena (completed 1710).
 Saleh Kamboh Mosque in Lahore is founded.
 Tomb of Nadira Begum in Lahore is started.

Births
 1650: December 1 (bapt.) – William Talman, English architect, landscape designer and collector (died 1719)
 1651: March 2 – Carlo Gimach, Maltese architect, engineer and poet (died 1730)
 1651: September 3 – Roger North, English lawyer, biographer and amateur of the arts (died 1734)
 1654: May 23 – Nicodemus Tessin the Younger, Swedish baroque architect (died 1728)
 1655: July 7 – Christoph Dientzenhofer, Bavarian baroque architect (died 1722)
 1656: July 20 – Johann Bernhard Fischer von Erlach, Austrian baroque architect (died 1723)

Deaths
 1652: June 21 – Inigo Jones, English architect and theatrical designer (born 1573)
 1655: July 15 – Girolamo Rainaldi, Italian architect (born 1570)

References

Architecture